Vesta Kasputė (Vesta Kalvytė; born 5 December 1984 in Panevėžys) is a Lithuanian chess player with the title of Woman FIDE Master (WFM), lawyer at "bnt" Law Firm.

Early years
In 2010, she was awarded the title of Women FIDE Master (WFM). In 2010, she won the Lithuanian Chess Championship for women.

Her current Elo rating is 2087 (as of January 2012), her highest Elo rating was 2102.

Personal life
2003 she attended Juozas Balčikonis Gymnasium. After she graduated from her 2003 to 2008 program of master studies in law at the Law Faculty of Vilnius University. From May 2011 she is associate at the East European law firm "bnt".

Kalvytė speaks English.

References

External links
 
 

1984 births
Living people
Lithuanian female chess players
Lithuanian jurists
People from Panevėžys
Vilnius University alumni
Chess Woman FIDE Masters